This is a list of notable events in music that took place in 1999.

Specific locations
1999 in British music
1999 in Norwegian music
1999 in South Korean music

Specific genres
1999 in classical music
1999 in country music
1999 in Latin music
1999 in jazz

Events

January
January 7
After eight years of marriage, musician husband Rod Stewart and supermodel wife Rachel Hunter announce their separation.
Paul McCartney attends the launch of his daughter Heather's first housewares collection in Georgia.
January 11 – During the American Music Awards, Billy Joel is awarded the Special Award of Merit for his "inspired songwriting skills" and "exciting showmanship."
January 12
Britney Spears releases her hit album ...Baby One More Time. The album is the second best-selling album of the 90s in the US and the third best-selling album of the 90s worldwide. It also enters the list of the top 20 best-selling albums of all time.
Fredrik Johansson is fired from Dark Tranquillity.
January 15–31 – After a short hiatus in 1998, the Big Day Out festival returns to Australia and New Zealand, headlined by Hole and Marilyn Manson.
January 21 – A&M Records is shut down and merged into the Universal Music Group umbrella label Interscope Geffen A&M. It would be relaunched in 2007.
January 22 – German industrial band KMFDM announces that it has disbanded.
January 30 – Britney Spears' hit album and single ...Baby One More Time both hit number one on the Billboard Charts. This is her first album (and song) to achieve this. The album spent 6 weeks on number 1 and a total of 103 weeks on the Billboard 200 Charts. It's number 16 on the Billboard list "Best Female Albums of all time" and number 41 on the Billboard list "Best Albums of all time". The single "...Baby One More Time" spent 2 consecutive weeks on number one on the Billboard Hot 100 and a total of 32 weeks on that same list.

February
February 9 – NSYNC release their third single from their debut album, "(God Must Have Spent) A Little More Time on You", which peaks in the top 10 on the Pop charts.
February 10 – Iron Maiden announces that singer Bruce Dickinson and guitarist Adrian Smith have rejoined the band.
February 14 – Elton John appears as himself in a special episode of the animated series The Simpsons.
February 15 – "Rolling Stones Day" is declared in Minnesota by Governor (and former Rolling Stones bodyguard) Jesse Ventura.
February 19 – Marilyn Manson files a defamation countersuit against former Spin Magazine editor Craig Marks, in response to a multimillion-dollar lawsuit that Marks filed in January against the singer, the record label Nothing/Interscope, and Manson's bodyguard agency.
February 20 – Trace Adkins performs his first concert following surgery for tendon damage and a broken ankle. Contrary to doctor's orders, Adkins does not remain seated during the performance.
February 22 – In Los Angeles, California, Stevie Wonder is honored as the 1999 MusiCares Person of the Year.
February 23 – Eminem releases his second studio album and major-label debut, The Slim Shady LP. It debuts at number two on the Billboard 200, selling over 200,000 copies in its first week. It remains on the Billboard 200 for 100 weeks.
February 24 – Lauryn Hill makes history at the 1999 Grammy Awards by being the first female artist to win five Grammys in one night. 
February 25 – The Artist Formerly Known as Prince files a lawsuit against nine Web sites for copyright and trademark infringement, claiming that the websites sell bootlegged recordings and offer unauthorized song downloads.

March
March 1 – Sony Music Distribution raises wholesale prices on audio compact discs by 8 US cents.
March 2 
Cher's song "Believe" reaches number one on the Billboard Hot 100, making Cher the oldest female artist (at the age of 52) to perform this feat. Cher also set the record for the longest hit-making career span, with 33 years between the release of her first and last Billboard Hot 100 #1 singles (1965 and 1999).
The House of Blues in Paradise, Nevada at the Mandalay Bay Resort. Bob Dylan performs a concert at the club and is joined by U2's lead singer Bono for an encore of "Knockin' on Heaven's Door".
March 5 – Trauma Records files a $40 million breach-of-contract lawsuit against the members of Bush for failing to deliver a new album.
March 6 – A 67-year-old George Jones is seriously injured in a car accident while on his way home. Jones' Lexus crashed into a bridge at about 1:30 p.m. It is later revealed that alcohol was a factor in the accident.
March 15 – Marilyn Manson is injured when he slips and falls during a concert at the Great Western Forum in Inglewood, California. Manson's performance is cut short.
March 16 – The Recording Industry Association of America introduces a new certification level, Diamond, for albums or singles selling ten million units.
March 17 – Namie Amuro's mother Emiko Taira is murdered.
March 21 – Irish girl band B*Witched score their fourth consecutive #1 with "Blame It On The Weatherman" on the UK singles chart. They become the first band to have all their first four singles enter at the top simultaneously and set a new record. It is broken a year later by Irish boy band Westlife.
March 23 – Green Day release "Nice Guys Finish Last", the lead track as well as the fourth and final single off their 1997 album Nimrod, and was their last single to be released in the 20th century.
March 27 – The Bee Gees end their One Night Only tour in Sydney, Australia.

April
April 10 – A charity tribute, the Concert for Linda McCartney is held at the Royal Albert Hall in London. Here, There and Everywhere: A Concert For Linda, features performances by Paul McCartney, Chrissie Hynde of the Pretenders, Elvis Costello, Sinéad O'Connor, and George Michael. Proceeds raised at the event went to animal rights causes.
April 19 – Neil Young performs at Madison Square Garden in New York City. Due to a mistake by a Madison Square Garden staff member, the marquee read "Bob Dylan, Tonight at 8pm". Young jokingly introduced one of his guitar players as Bob Dylan during the show.
April 20
Billy Joel performs at Meadowlands in New Jersey. Joel announces that this would be his last public pop music concert. Joel also announces plans on devoting his future efforts to classical music.
The Columbine High School massacre takes place in Jefferson County, Colorado, sparking a widespread moral panic that ultimately tries to place the blame on violent media, including music perceived to be violent and/or connected to the goth culture. American rocker Marilyn Manson receives the brunt of the blame despite evidence that neither of the shooters were fans of his. Manson then withdraws, only to address the issue in the form of his fourth studio album. The finger is also pointed at German industrial metal acts Rammstein and KMFDM, of whom the shooters were fans. This sensationalism gradually wanes in the years following, and all three music acts ironically achieve more mainstream acceptance in the U.S. than they had prior to the massacre. Christian Contemporary Music artists respond to the concept that Atheism caused the shooting and in particular the Cassie Bernall urban legend (about a girl who was initially believed to have been shot in the head for answering "yes" when perpetrator Eric Harris asked her if she believed in God) with songs such as "A New Hope" by Five Iron Frenzy, about a band member's sister who had been trapped in the choir room returning to school after the shooting, and "This Is Your Time" by Michael W. Smith, a direct response to the Cassie Bernall story.
April 26 – Musician and former bandleader of The Sound, Adrian Borland, commits suicide in London.
April 28 – Tom Petty and the Heartbreakers receive a star on the Hollywood Walk of Fame.
April 30 – Columbine High School massacre: Aerosmith visits Columbine High School shooting victim Lance Kirklin in a Colorado hospital before a concert in Denver, Colorado. Kirklin was one of 24 wounded in the April 20 shooting, 13 others were killed.

May
May 1
"The Paintings of Paul McCartney" exhibit opens at the Lyz Art Forum in Siegen, Germany. The exhibit features around 70 paintings by the former Beatle.
Musical group Atari Teenage Riot starts a riot in Berlin with their anti-consumer and anti-government lyrics.
May 18
The Backstreet Boys release their third studio album Millennium both in the US and internationally.
May 29 – The 44th Eurovision Song Contest, held at the International Convention Center in Jerusalem, is won by Swedish singer Charlotte Nilsson with the song "Take Me to Your Heaven".

June
June 1
 Peer-to-peer file sharing network Napster is launched.
 Blink-182 release their third studio album Enema of the State, which debuted at #9 on the Billboard 200, skyrocketing the band into mainstream success and spearheading a second wave of pop-punk.
June 2 – The Backstreet Boys smash the old first-week sales record of Garth Brooks' 1.08 million, with Millennium, which sold over 1.13 million in its first week and was the first album to sell over 500,000 copies at least 2 weeks. The album holds at No. 1 first-weeks sales record of the 1990s.
June 13 – S Club 7 debut at #1 on the UK singles chart with their first single "Bring It All Back" and become the largest vocal group to enter at the top.
June 22
 Christina Aguilera releases "Genie in a Bottle", which becomes a worldwide hit, selling over seven million copies.
 Limp Bizkit's second album, Significant Other, debuts at number one on the Billboard 200, with 643,874 copies sold in its first week. The album launches them into mainstream success.
June 28 – Britney Spears embarks on her first concert tour, ...Baby One More Time Tour. The tour only reached North America and garnered a positive review, but generated some controversy due to her racy outfit and accusation of lip syncing.
 June 29 
Santana and Matchbox Twenty vocalist Rob Thomas release "Smooth", which peaks at #1 for 12 weeks.
Razor and Tie releases the single-disc version of Monster Ballads. It would eventually be certified platinum at the end of the year.

July
July 1 – The new Scottish Parliament is formally opened with a rock concert in the shadow of Edinburgh Castle and is headlined by Garbage, whose lead singer Shirley Manson is at the time one of the biggest music stars from Scotland.
July 3 – Indie rock icon Mark Sandman collapses on stage at the Giardini del Principe in Palestrina, Latium, Italy (near Rome) while performing with Morphine. He is soon pronounced dead of a heart attack at the age of 46. Morphine immediately disbands.
July 8 – Adrian Erlandsson quits The Haunted as the drummer while the band hires Per Möller Jensen as Erlandsson's replacement.
July 12 – Gregg Alexander issues a press release dissolving the New Radicals.
July 13–18 – The third Yoyo A Go Go punk and indie rock festival opens in Olympia, Washington.
July 20 – Powerman 5000 release their second studio album Tonight the Stars Revolt!
July 22–25 – The highly anticipated Woodstock 99 festival takes place in Rome, New York. Performers include the Red Hot Chili Peppers, Korn, Kid Rock, Limp Bizkit, Rage Against the Machine, DMX, James Brown, and Jamiroquai.
July 27 – Machine Head release their third studio album The Burning Red.

August
August 14–15 – The Artist Formerly Known as Prince holds a weekend yard sale at his Paisley Park Studios, with part of the proceeds going to benefit underprivileged youth.
August 24 – Christina Aguilera releases her self titled debut album. It will become one of the best selling albums of the year and sell over 14 million copies.
August 27–29 – The third Terrastock festival is held in London.
August 31 – Megadeth release eighth studio album Risk.

September
September 1 – The Irish Music Hall of Fame opens; Van Morrison is the first inducted into the museum.
September 9 – The MTV Video Music Awards of 1999 take place. Britney Spears has the most memorable performance of the event, performing her hit single "...Baby One More Time"; NSYNC joined her with their song "Tearin' Up My Heart".
September 14 – Nu-Metal Band Dope Release their debut studio album Felons and Revolutionaries.
September 17 – Rapper Eminem is sued by his mother for $10 million, claiming that public comments he made about her were slanderous and had caused emotional stress and financial harm. She eventually collects a mere $1,600 settlement in 2001.
September 21 – David Bowie's twenty-first studio album Hours becomes the first complete album by a major artist legally available to download over the Internet, preceding the physical release by two weeks.
September 30 – Billboard announces that Ministry of Sound Recordings Ltd is expanding into Australia after ending a partnership with MDS Dancenet and establishes Ministry of Sound Australia, known until 2005 as Ministry of Sound (UK) Pty Ltd. Ministry UK also secures a distribution deal with EMI Music Group Australasia Pty Ltd.

October
October 9
"Heartbreaker", the lead single from Mariah Carey's seventh studio album, Rainbow, reaches #1 on the Billboard 100, becoming her 14th #1 single and also her 59th week atop the chart. When it stayed at #1 for a further week Carey surpassed The Beatles for the act with the most weeks spent at number one. The song also topped charts in Canada and New Zealand.
The first Coachella Valley Music and Arts Festival is held in California. The inaugural line-up consists of Beck, The Chemical Brothers, Tool, Morrissey and Rage Against the Machine.
The anti-poverty initiative NetAid is launched with simultaneous benefit concerts in London, New Jersey and Geneva.
October 19 – 98 Degrees release their first Christmas album This Christmas.
October 20 – Melissa Auf der Maur leaves Hole.

November
November 5 
Australian independent record label Liberation Music is formed.
Gary Cherone leaves Van Halen.
November 11 – Toploader release their debut studio album, Onka's Big Moka. 
November 12 – 1970s rock star Gary Glitter is jailed for four months for downloading child pornography off the Internet.
November 15 – Korn performs their entire album Issues at the Apollo Theater in New York City, becoming the first rock band ever to perform at the Apollo.
November 16
Korn's fourth studio album, Issues, debuts at number 1 on the Billboard 200 with 575,000 copies sold in its first week.
Will Smith releases his second solo studio album Willennium.
November 23 – University of Oregon student Jeffrey Levy, having downloaded MP3s without permission, is the first person ever convicted for copyright infringement under the NET Act of 1997. He is sentenced to two years of probation and a limit on Internet access.

December
December 4 – The Spice Girls start their Christmas Tour around the UK, dubbed as the Christmas in Spiceworld Tour.
December 14
BMI announces the most played songs on American radio and television in the 20th century BMI Announces Top 100 Songs of the Century (full list)
Paul McCartney returns to The Cavern Club to play a special concert for 300 fans.
Boy George is injured by a 62-pound disco ball that falls from a concert venue's ceiling during a rehearsal, nearly killing him as it almost landed on his head.
December 27 – Puff Daddy and fellow rapper Shyne are arrested for weapons violations and other charges after a shooting in a Manhattan nightclub that leaves three people injured.
December 30 – George Harrison survives a knife attack by an intruder in his Friar Park home.
December 31 – Many special New Year's Eve concerts are held around the world to celebrate the arrival of the year 2000. Big shows include Barbra Streisand at The MGM Grand Las Vegas, The Eagles at the Staples Center in Los Angeles, Billy Joel at Madison Square Garden, and Metallica with Kid Rock and Ted Nugent playing for 54,000 the Pontiac Silverdome. The biggest concert that night is by Phish, however, playing for 75,000 people at the Big Cypress Indian Reservation in Florida.

Unknown
Vocalist Lawrence Mackrory quits Darkane. The band hires by Andreas Sydow as his replacement after.

Bands formed
See Musical groups established in 1999

Bands reformed
The Animals

Bands disbanded
See Musical groups disestablished in 1999

Albums released

January–March

April–June

July–September

October–December

Release date unknown
Amalgamation – Trapt
The Collection – Spandau Ballet
Ella in Budapest, Hungary – Ella Fitzgerald
Face Down – Serial Joe
In Stereo – Bomfunk MC's
A Matter of Time - Hilltop Hoods
Mi Día de la Independencia – Lynda Thomas
Motor Driven Bimbo – Rockbitch
My Fruit Psychobells...A Seed Combustible – maudlin of the Well
Retrograss - John Hartford, David Grisman, & Mike Seeger
Side Show Freaks – 40 Below Summer
Simple Pleasure – Tindersticks

Programs Releasing this Year

Biggest hit singles
The following songs achieved the highest chart positions
in the charts of 1999.

Top 40 Chart hit singles

Other Chart hit singles

Notable singles

Other Notable singles

Top 10 selling albums of the year in USA
Backstreet Boys – Millennium
Britney Spears – ...Baby One More Time
Shania Twain – Come on Over
'N Sync – *NSYNC
Ricky Martin – Ricky Martin
Christina Aguilera – Christina Aguilera
Santana – Supernatural
TLC – FanMail
Kid Rock – Devil Without a Cause
Eminem – The Slim Shady LP

Classical music
Samuel Adler – Viola Concerto
Leonardo Balada – Piano Concerto No. 3
Michael Daugherty – Hell's Angels
Joël-François Durand – La Terre et le Feu for oboe and orchestra
Carlo Forlivesi – Requiem
Juan Guinjoan – Fanfarria
Patrick Hawes – The Call (song cycle)
Joe Jackson – Symphony No. 1
Karl Jenkins – The Armed Man: A Mass for Peace
John Kinsella – Symphony No. 8: Into the New Millennium
Richard Payne – Saxophone Concerto
Wolfgang Rihm
Ende der Handschrift. Elf späte Gedichte von Heiner Müller
Zwiesprache for piano
Karlheinz Stockhausen –
Klavierstück XVII, for 8- or 2-track tape, electronic keyboard, and sound projectionist, 7 ex Nr. 64
Komet (Comet) for 8- or 2-track tape, percussionist, and sound projectionist, 7 ex Nr. 64
Lichter—Wasser (Sunday Greeting), for soprano, tenor, and orchestra, Nr. 75
Paare vom Freitag, with soprano, bass, electronic instruments (tape), Nr. 63
Mindaugas Urbaitis
Fanfare for the Vilnius Festival for orchestra
Der Fall Wagner for ensemble

Opera
William Bolcom – A View from the Bridge
Deborah Drattell – Festival of Regrets
Rued Langgaard – Antikrist (composed 1921–30, premiered 1999)
Daron Hagen – Bandanna
John Harbison – The Great Gatsby
Nicholas Lens – The Accacha Chronicles Trilogy: Terra Terra – The Aquarius Era

Jazz

Musical theater
Annie Get Your Gun (Irving Berlin) – Broadway revival
Fame – The Musical – London production
Kiss Me, Kate (Cole Porter) – Broadway revival
Mamma Mia! (ABBA) – London production
My Fair Lady (Lerner & Loewe) – London revival
Saturday Night Fever (musical) – Broadway production opened at the Minskoff Theatre and ran for 501 performances

Musical films
Buena Vista Social Club
Mother
Pyaar Mein Kabhi Kabhi
Raja
Sangamam
South Park: Bigger, Longer & Uncut
Sugar Town
Topsy-Turvy

Births
January 1 – Diamond White, American singer, actress, and voice actress
January 5 – Marc Yu, American pianist and cellist
January 6 – Polo G, American rapper and songwriter
January 8 – Damiano David, Italian singer and songwriter, vocal of Måneskin
January 11 – Christian Nodal, Mexican singer
January 15 – Minami Kato, Japanese idol and actress (former NGT48)
January 21 – Em Beihold, American singer-songwriter
January 22 – Ravyn Lenae, American singer-songwriter
January 23 – Madi Davis, American singer-songwriter, team Pharrell Williams
January 24 – Niki, Indonesian R&B singer-songwriter and record producer
January 25
Lucas Wong, Hong Kong rapper and singer (NCT, WayV)
Jai Waetford, Australian recording artist and actor  (Contestant on X Factor Australia)
January 28 – Hrvy, English singer
February 7 – Bea Miller, American singer-songwriter and actress
February 16 – Girl in Red, Norwegian Indie musician and record producer
March 5
Madison Beer, American singer, songwriter, activist and actress
Yeri, South Korean singer-songwriter (Red Velvet)
March 25 – Iann Dior, American rapper and singer and songwriter
April 2 – Elaine, South African singer and songwriter
April 4
Sheku Kanneh-Mason, British cellist, BBC Young Musician 2016 winner
Miki Nishino, Japanese talent and idol (former AKB48)
April 6 – Lick-G, Japanese rapper
April 9 – Lil Nas X, American rapper, singer and songwriter
April 20 – Carly Rose Sonenclar, American X Factor runner up, actress and singer
April 23
Chaeyoung, South Korean singer, rapper (TWICE)
Laufey (singer), Icelandic singer and songwriter
Claud Mintz, American singer
May 11
Sabrina Carpenter, American singer, songwriter and actress
Hwiyoung - South Korean singer
May 23 – Trinidad Cardona, American rapper
June 14 – Tzuyu, Taiwanese singer (Twice)
June 17 – Frances Forever, American singer
June 18
Trippie Redd, American singer, rapper, songwriter
Willie Spence, American singer and contestant on American Idol (d. 2022)
June 20 – Yui Mizuno, Japanese musician, singer, model, and actress (Babymetal)
June 29 – Aitana (singer), Spanish singer, songwriter and model
July 4 – Moa Kikuchi, Japanese singer, musician, actress and model (Babymetal)
July 5 – Kang Hye-won, South Korean singer (former Iz*One)
July 14 – Camryn, American singer and actress
July 20 – Pop Smoke, American rapper (d. 2020)
July 22 – Alma Agger, Danish singer
July 26 – Mizuki Yamashita, Japanese idol, model and actress (Nogizaka46)
July 28 - Glorilla, American rapper 
August 2 – Mark Lee, Canadian rapper, songwriter (NCT, SuperM)
August 8
Xiaojun, Chinese singer and dancer (WayV and NCT)
Laura Kamhuber, Austrian singer
August 11 – Changbin, South Korean rapper and songwriter (Stray Kids)
August 13
Giulia Be, Brazilian singer
Lennon Stella, Canadian singer and actress
August 19 – Salem Ilese, American singer-songwriter
August 25 – Silver Sphere, American independent singer-songwriter and musician
September 3 – Rich Brian, Indonesian rapper, songwriter, and record producer
September 7 – Gracie Abrams,  American singer-songwriter
September 15 – Nana Owada, Japanese idol and actress (former AKB48)
September 23 – Yuqi, Chinese singer-songwriter, television host ((G)I-dle)
September 28 – Hendery – Chinese singer (WayV and NCT)
September 29 – Choi Ye-na, South Korean singer (former Iz*One)
October 1 – Marlisa Punzalan, Australian singer, X Factor Australia 6th series winner
October 20
YoungBoy Never Broke Again, American rapper, singer, and songwriter
Chuu, South Korean singer and television personality (Loona)
October 22 - Sub Urban (musician), an American singer, producer and songwriter (Benee, Bella Poarch, Aurora (singer)) 
October 23 – Yui Kobayashi, Japanese idol, model and actress (Sakurazaka46)
November 10 – Petit Biscuit, French DJ and music producer\
November 11 - Samara Joy, American jazz singer 
November 21 – Isaiah Firebrace, Australian singer, X Factor Australia 8th series winner
December 17
Holly Humberstone British singer-songwriter
Mirei Sasaki, Japanese model, idol, actress and reporter (Hinatazaka46)
December 18 – YBN Nahmir, American rapper and songwriter
December 25
Dynoro, Lithuanian DJ and music producer
Bulow, German musician
 Unknown: Kim Dracula,  an Australian trap metal/hardcore music artist

Deaths
January 2 – Rolf Liebermann (88), composer
January 21 – Charles Brown, (76), blues singer and pianist
January 22 – Gabor Carelli (83), operatic tenor
January 23 – "Prince" Lincoln Thompson (49), reggae musician
February 3 – Gwen Guthrie (48), singer
February 4 – Kenneth C. Burns (68), country musician
February 6 – Jimmy Roberts (74), American tenor
February 12 – Toni Fisher (67), singer
February 14 – Buddy Knox (65), singer and songwriter
February 15
Lamont "Big L" Coleman (24), rapper (gunshot)
Agnes Bernelle (75), actress and singer
February 16 – Necil Kâzım Akses (90), Turkish composer (date of death from this contemporary newspaper)
March 2
David Ackles (62), singer/songwriter
Dusty Springfield (59), singer (breast cancer)
March 4 – Eddie Dean (91), country music artist, actor
March 7 – Lowell Fulson (77), blues guitarist and songwriter
March 9 – Harry Somers (73), Canadian composer
March 12 – Yehudi Menuhin (92), violinist and musical director
March 13 – Bidu Sayão (97), Brazilian opera singer
March 14
 Gregg Diamond (49), jazz pianist
 Marius Müller (40), Norwegian guitarist (car crash)
March 26 – Ananda Shankar (50), Indian classical musician and composer (cardiac arrest)
March 28 – Freaky Tah (27), rapper (Lost Boyz) (shot)
March 29 – Joe Williams (80), jazz singer
April 1 – Jesse Stone (97), R & B musician and songwriter
April 3 – Lionel Bart (68), songwriter and composer
April 6 – Red Norvo (91), jazz musician
April 14 – Anthony Newley (67), songwriter, actor and singer
April 16 – Skip Spence (52), musician (Jefferson Airplane, Moby Grape), lung cancer
April 21 – Buddy Rogers (94), jazz musician
April 25
Roger Troutman (47), R&B singer (gunshot wounds)
Larry Troutman (54), R&B percussionist (suicide after killing younger brother)
Kemi Olusanya (35), British drum and bass duo Kemistry & Storm (freak highway accident)
April 26 – Adrian Borland (41), English singer, songwriter, guitarist (The Sound) (suicide)
April 27
Al Hirt (76), New Orleans trumpeter
Maria Stader (87), operatic soprano
April 30 – Darrell Sweet (51), drummer (Nazareth), heart attack
May 8 – Leon Thomas (61), jazz singer
May 14 – William Tucker, guitarist, Ministry, suicide by slitting own throat
May 17 – Bruce Fairbairn (49), producer
May 18 – Augustus Pablo (44), reggae producer and instrumentalist (collapsed lung)
May 26 – Paul Sacher (93), Swiss conductor
 May 30 – Don Harper, Australian jazz violinist and composer (cancer)
June 5 – Mel Tormé, (73), singer
June 15 – Fausto Papetti, (76), Italian saxophonist
June 16 – Screaming Lord Sutch (58), UK musician
June 21 – Kami, (26), Japanese drummer for Malice Mizer, subarachnoid hemorrhage
June 27 – Sven Einar Englund, (83), Finnish composer
July 1
Dennis Brown (42), reggae singer
Guy Mitchell (72), pop singer
July 3 – Mark Sandman, (46), alternative rock musician, member of Morphine, heart attack
July 6
Benny Bell, (93), musician
Joaquín Rodrigo (97), Spanish composer
July 11 – Helen Forrest (82), big band singer
July 13 – Louise Caselotti (88), operatic mezzo-soprano
July 17 – Kevin Wilkinson (41), drummer (suicide by hanging)
July 22 – Gar Samuelson (41), American drummer (liver failure)
July 27 – Harry "Sweets" Edison (83), jazz trumpeter
July 29 – Anita Carter (66), country and folk singer
August 3 – Leroy Vinnegar (71), jazz bassist (heart attack)
August 20 – Bobby Sheehan (31), bassist for Blues Traveler (drug overdose)
August 25 – Rob Fisher (42), keyboardist and songwriter (cancer)
September 8 – Moondog (83), avant-garde musician
September 10
Beau Jocque (46), zydeco musician
Alfredo Kraus (72), opera singer
September 17 – Frankie Vaughan (71), British singer
October 4 – Art Farmer (71), jazz trumpeter
October 6 – Amalia Rodrigues (79), Portuguese singer
October 9 – Milt Jackson (76), jazz vibraphonist
October 12 – Frank Frost (63), blues harmonica player
October 15 – Josef Locke (82), Irish tenor
October 16 – Ella Mae Morse, (75), singer
October 19 – Harry Bannink (70), Dutch songwriter
October 26
Hoyt Axton (61), country music singer/songwriter (heart attack)
Rex Gildo (63), German singer
October 28 – Robert Linn (74), composer and teacher
November 8 – Lester Bowie (58), jazz trumpet player and composer
November 13 – Donald Mills (84), American singer (Mills Brothers)
November 18 – Doug Sahm (58), country and rock musician
November 21 – Marie Kraja (88), operatic and folk singer
December 2 – Charlie Byrd (74), jazz guitarist
December 3 – Scatman John (57), pop musician
December 6 – Todd Barnes (34), T.S.O.L.
December 10 – Rick Danko (56), rock singer in The Band (drug-related heart failure)
December 17 – Grover Washington Jr. (56), American saxophonist
December 18 – Joe Higgs (59), reggae musician
December 20 – Hank Snow (85), country music artist
December 26 – Curtis Mayfield (57), singer/composer

Awards
The following artists are inducted into the Rock and Roll Hall of Fame: Billy Joel, Curtis Mayfield, Paul McCartney, Del Shannon, Dusty Springfield, Bruce Springsteen and The Staple Singers
Inductees of the GMA Gospel Music Hall of Fame include The Fairfield Four and Second Chapter of Acts

Grammy Awards
41st Annual Grammy Awards

Country Music Association Awards
 1999 Country Music Association Awards

Eurovision Song Contest
Eurovision Song Contest 1999

Mercury Music Prize
Ok – Talvin Singh wins.

MTV Video Music Awards
1999 MTV Video Music Awards

Glenn Gould Prize
Yo-Yo Ma (laureate), Wu Man (protégé)

Charts

Triple J Hottest 100
Triple J Hottest 100, 1999
Pop Culture Madness 1999 Pop Music Chart

See also
 1999 in music (UK)
 1999 in Norwegian music
 :Category:Record labels established in 1999

References

 
20th century in music
Music by year